Nátalia Mayara Azevedo da Costa (born 3 April 1994) is a former Brazilian wheelchair tennis player who competed in international level events. She is a double gold medalist at the 2015 Parapan American Games and competed at the Paralympic Games twice.

Mayara lost her legs after she was hit by a bus that went onto a sidewalk. She began playing tennis and swimming aged eleven and she pursued a career in wheelchair tennis when she participated at a youth world championship as a junior tennis player in 2011.

References

External links
 
 

1994 births
Living people
Brazilian female tennis players
Wheelchair tennis players
Paralympic wheelchair tennis players of Brazil
Wheelchair tennis players at the 2012 Summer Paralympics
Wheelchair tennis players at the 2016 Summer Paralympics
Sportspeople from Recife
Tennis players from São Paulo
20th-century Brazilian women
21st-century Brazilian women